This is a list of settlements in Lemnos regional unit in Greece:

 Agios Dimitrios
 Agios Efstratios
 Angariones
 Atsiki
 Dafni
 Fisini
 Kalliopi
 Kallithea
 Kaminia
 Karpasi
 Kaspakas
 Katalakko
 Kontias
 Kontopouli
 Kornos
 Livadochori
 Lychna
 Moudros
 Myrina
 Nea Koutali
 Pedino
 Panagia
 Plaka
 Platy
 Portianou
 Repanidi
 Romanou
 Roussopouli
 Sardes
 Skandali
 Thanos
 Tsimandria
 Varos

By municipality
Agios Efstratios (no subdivisions)

See also

List of towns and villages in Greece

 
Lemnos
Populated places in Lemnos